The 2002–03 season of the Philippine Basketball League (PBL).

2002-03 Challenge Cup

Team standings

Welcoat Paintmasters is the top team in the eliminations and will enjoy a twice-to-beat advantage against the fourth finisher in the crossover semis. Welcoat will meet the winner of ICTSI and LBC-Batangas. Blu Detergent and Dazz finished with identical 7-4 won-loss cards and will play in the other crossover semis.

Crossover semifinals

Welcoat and Dazz had a twice-to-beat advantage against the two other semifinalist and they made it to the championship round.

Finals

Comebacking Welcoat Paintmasters completed a three-game sweep over Dazz. Coach Leo Austria now won three PBL titles, two of which came when he was a Shark Energy Drink mentor. The Welcoat franchise won their fifth PBL championship, and all their series victories were via sweeps.

Individual awards
 Most Valuable Player: Rommel Adducul (Welcoat)
 Sportsmanship Award: Alex Compton (LBC-Batangas)
 Most Improved Player Award: Paul Artadi (Welcoat)
 Top Newcomer: Mark Cardona (ICTSI-La Salle)
 Finals MVP: Rommel Adducul and Ronald Tubid (Welcoat)
 Mythical First Team
 Rommel Adducul (Welcoat)
 Eddie Laure (Welcoat)
 Ronald Tubid (Welcoat)
 Aries Dimaunahan (Blu)
 Mark Cardona (ICTSI-La Salle)

2003 Sunkist-Unity Cup

Two new teams joined the league, replacing Cheeseballs-Shark and Sunkist-Pampanga, these are Viva Mineral Water, coach by Koy Banal, and Nutrilicious, handled by Monel Kallos.

Hapee (formerly Dazz) and Viva Mineral Water advances to the championship after the double-round semifinals among the top four teams in the eliminations.

Finals

Hapee Toothpaste won their first title since the 1996 Reinforced Conference, denying Viva Mineral Water a championship in their very first try. Hapee mentor Junel Baculi won his sixth title as a coach.

References

External links
 www.philippinebasketball.ph

Philippine Basketball League seasons
League
League
PBL